Sore is the second studio album released by American sludge metal band Buzzov*en in 1994, through Roadrunner Records. It has since gone out of print.

Track listing
"Sore" – 9:20
"Unwilling to Explain" – 2:16
"Hollow" – 5:09
"Done" – 2:46
"I Don't Like You" – 5:42
"Broken" – 6:07
"Pathetic" – 6:16
"Should I" – 6:20
"Behaved" – 2:31
"Blinded" – 4:14
"Grit" – 2:42
"This Is Not ..." – 19:41

Personnel
Kirk – vocals, guitar, production
Buddy – guitar
LeDarrell – bass
Ash – drums
Billy Anderson – production, engineering
George Marino – mastering
Vigil – backing vocals on "Broken"
Craig Lima – cover art

References

Buzzoven albums
1994 albums
Roadrunner Records albums
Albums produced by Billy Anderson (producer)